The smooth leatherjacket or velvet leatherjacket, Meuschenia scaber, is a filefish of the family Monacanthidae, found off eastern Australia and all around New Zealand to depths of about 100 m, on rocky weedy reef areas.  Its length is between 25 and 35 cm.  In New Zealand it is simply known as leatherjacket as it is the only fish of this family commonly found there.

Distribution
Cape Naturaliste, Western Australia, to Sydney, New South Wales, and around Tasmania. Also New Zealand.

See also
 Leather jack

References

 
 
 Tony Ayling & Geoffrey Cox, Collins Guide to the Sea Fishes of New Zealand,  (William Collins Publishers Ltd, Auckland, New Zealand 1982) 

Monacanthidae
Fish described in 1801